Kasegar Mahalleh (also Romanized as Kāsegar Mahalleh; also known as Kāseh Gar Maḩalleh) is a village in Mian Band Rural District, in the Central District of Nur County, Mazandaran Province, Iran. At the 2006 census, its population was 1,121, in 251 families.

References 

Populated places in Nur County